Auru Anne ( born on  25 August 1960) is Ugandan politician. She was the  Member of Parliament in the eighth and ninth Parliament of Uganda representing Moyo District as an Independent Candidate and  National Resistance Movement (NRM) political party ticket respectively.

Political career 
She has served in two parliament terms: the eighth and ninth parliament of Uganda. In 2011, Auru Anne contested as the Moyo District Woman Representative on an Independent ticket and she won. In 2016, Auru Anne contested as the Moyo District Woman Representative on the ruling National Resistance Movement (NRM) political party ticket and again she won.

She lost her seat to Hon. Moriku Joyce Kaducu.

Personal life 
Auru Anne was summoned by the Uganda National Police over allegation in September 2014, clashes between the Madi community in Moyo and Kuku community of Kajo-Keji County in South Sudan that resulted in loss of lives of about 17 people, cattle raiding, burning houses and robbery.

See also 

 Parliament of Uganda
 List of members of the eighth Parliament of Uganda
 List of members of the ninth Parliament of Uganda
 Politics of Uganda

References 

1960 births

People from Moyo District
Members of the Parliament of Uganda
Women members of the Parliament of Uganda
National Resistance Movement politicians
Living people
Independent politicians